The Lancaster, Oxford and Southern Railway (LO&S) was a  narrow gauge railway that operated in southeastern Pennsylvania between 1912 and 1918, as a successor company following the bankruptcy of the Lancaster, Oxford and Southern Railroad. The main line connected Oxford and Peach Bottom, Pennsylvania.

History
The original line was built between 1872 and 1878 as the Eastern Division of the Peach Bottom Railway. The line began in Oxford, connecting with the Philadelphia and Baltimore Central Railroad, and proceeded roughly westward to Fairmont, then southwest to Peach Bottom, on the eastern shore of the Susquehanna River. The line served passengers and freight from farm communities, but there were no industries on the line, and it was not successful financially. It originally used type 2-4-0 steam locomotives.

In 1881 the Peach Bottom Railway declared bankruptcy and was reorganized as the Peach Bottom Railroad. In 1890 the company went bankrupt again and it was sold to investors who reorganized as the  narrow gauge Lancaster, Oxford and Southern Railroad. These investors hoped to connect Lancaster County to the Baltimore and Ohio Railroad (B&O) by building a branch line from Fairmont, on the existing LO&S line, to Quarryville, as well as an extension from Oxford southeast to Singerly, Maryland (north of Elkton) on the B&O main line. To this end they planned to convert the existing tracks to standard gauge. By 1905 the railroad had six locomotives—the newer models were type 4-4-0—and 24 freight cars.

The LO&S owners did not have sufficient finances to build the B&O connection, nor to convert to standard gauge. In 1906 they opened a branch line from Fairmont to Quarryville.

Decline and liquidation
The company continued to struggle financially and in 1911 it entered receivership. New owners took control in 1912 of the reorganized Lancaster, Oxford and Southern Railway, but they were no more successful in reviving the company, and by 1914 the LO&S discontinued all trains, except for a small mail operation using a speeder. In October 1914 the railroad was sold again, and an attempt was made to operate more economically by converting some passenger cars to gasoline-powered railcars (sometimes called "doodlebugs"). Competition for freight traffic from trucks, as well as the high prices being offered for scrap metal during World War I, led the management to permanently close the railroad in 1918. One doodlebug car, #10, was sold to the Strasburg Railroad, where it continues to operate in passenger service.

See also
 List of defunct Pennsylvania railroads

References

 
 

Defunct Pennsylvania railroads
Narrow gauge railroads in Pennsylvania
Railway companies established in 1912
Railway companies disestablished in 1918
3 ft gauge railways in the United States
1912 establishments in Pennsylvania
1918 disestablishments in Pennsylvania
American companies established in 1912
American companies disestablished in 1918